Jamshed R. Tata, FRS (13 April 1930 to 8 October 2020) was an Indian-born endocrinologist who spent most of his career at the National Institute for Medical Research researching thyroid hormones. His key discovery was that thyroid hormones control metamorphosis in frogs by regulation the action of genes.

Biography 
Jamshed Rustom Tata is most commonly known as Jamshed R. Tata. He was born 13 April 1930 in Bombay.

He lived in Mill Hill, London NW7 for the last 60 years of his life and died in London on 8 October 2020. His French wife Renée predeceased him. They had two sons and a daughter.

Education 
He was awarded his BSc from Bombay University in 1949, then MSc from the Indian Institute of Science in 1951. He then went to University of Paris and was awarded his PhD in 1954.

Scientific career 
He started his scientific career as a postdoctoral fellowship at Sloan-Kettering Institute between 1954–56 and then moved to NIMR (National Institute for Medical Research, London) in 1956. He spent most of his career at NIMR, except for a two-year spell as visiting scientist at the University of Stockholm (1960-1962). He was a staff scientist (1962-1973). In 1973 he became Head of the Division of Developmental Biochemistry and continued in this post till his retirement in 1996. After retirement he continued as a visiting scientist at NIMR till the site closed in 2016. While at NIMR he worked closely with Rosalind Pitt-Rivers and co-authored a number of books with her.

He was recognised for his work on thyroid hormones, discovering that the hormones act by regulating the activity of genes, rather than controlling metabolism, authoring over 200 papers, including a history of developmental biology at NIMR

He was awarded the Colworth Medal by the Biochemical Society in 1964. He was elected as FRS in 1973

References 

1930 births
Living people
Indian endocrinologists
Fellows of the Royal Society
Foreign Fellows of the Indian National Science Academy
National Institute for Medical Research faculty